Shri Rajesh Tacho, son of Late Khore Tacho is the incumbent MLA of Anini. He is a part of the Indian National Congress Party. He became the MLA of Anini when he was 47. He graduated out of the Government High School of Roing in 1979 as 10th pass .

References 

Indian National Congress politicians
Living people
1957 births
Bharatiya Janata Party politicians from Arunachal Pradesh
People from Dibang Valley district
People from Anini
People's Party of Arunachal politicians
Arunachal Pradesh MLAs 1999–2004
Arunachal Pradesh MLAs 2014–2019